Zir Deh (also Romanized as Zīr Deh) is a village in Chapar Khaneh Rural District, Khomam District, Rasht County, Gilan Province, Iran. At the 2006 census, its population was 414, in 121 families.

References 

Populated places in Rasht County